Jan van Beers may refer to:
 Jan van Beers (poet)
 Jan van Beers (artist)